The Battle of Petelia was an ambush during the Second Punic War that took place in the summer of 208 BC near Petelia. The Carthaginian general Hannibal surprised and destroyed a large Roman detachment.

Prelude
In the summer of 208 BC, the Roman consuls Marcus Claudius Marcellus and Titus Quinctius Crispinus ordered a part of the Roman garrison of Tarentum to move up and assist in an offensive against the Carthaginian-allied town of Locri. Hannibal received word from the people of Thurii of the Roman move and laid an ambush along the road from Tarentum with 3,000 infantry and 2,000 cavalry.

Battle
The Carthaginian force was hidden at the foot of the hill of Petelia. The Romans failed to conduct a reconnaissance and the Carthaginians achieved complete surprise. They killed 2,000 Romans and captured 1,500. The rest of the Roman force fled cross-country back to Tarentum.

References

Bibliography
 

Petelia
Petelia
Petelia
Battles involving the Roman Republic
Battles involving Carthage